Annie Au Wing Chi  (born February 9, 1989), known as Annie Au, is a former professional squash player who represented Hong Kong.

Career
Annie is a left-hander from Asia who has made a great impression as a junior. Not only winning British Junior Open titles but reaching the final of the Asian Junior and being a member of the Hong Kong team which won the world juniors is also on her record. She is a tribute to the Hong Kong Squash development schemes. She started playing squash at school aged thirteen through the promotional scheme. She was coached by national coach Faheem Khan.

Au reached a career-high world ranking of World No. 6 in May 2012.

In 2016, she was part of the Hong Kong team that won the bronze medal at the 2016 Women's World Team Squash Championships in France. Two years later in 2018, she was again part of the Hong Kong team that won the bronze medal at the 2018 Women's World Team Squash Championships. Au retired in 2020 to join the police force.

See also
 Official Women's Squash World Ranking
 WISPA Awards

References

External links 
 
 
 

1989 births
Living people
Hong Kong people
Hong Kong female squash players
Asian Games medalists in squash
Asian Games gold medalists for Hong Kong
Asian Games silver medalists for Hong Kong
Asian Games bronze medalists for Hong Kong
Squash players at the 2010 Asian Games
Squash players at the 2014 Asian Games
Squash players at the 2018 Asian Games
Medalists at the 2010 Asian Games
Medalists at the 2014 Asian Games
Medalists at the 2018 Asian Games
21st-century Hong Kong women